The 1989 Tooheys 1000 was the 30th running of the Bathurst 1000 touring car race. It was held on 1 October 1989 at the Mount Panorama Circuit just outside Bathurst, Australia. The race was held for cars eligible under International Group A touring car regulations with three engine capacity classes.

The race was won by the Dick Johnson Racing Ford Sierra of Dick Johnson and John Bowe. The pair lead almost the whole of the race and was only seriously threatened by the Allan Moffat run Sierra of German drivers Klaus Niedzwiedz and Frank Biela. Third and fourth places were awarded to the official factory Nissan team entries with the Nissan Skyline of Jim Richards and Mark Skaife finishing third.

The Tooheys Top Ten runoff for pole position was notable for Peter Brock discharging his Ford Sierra's engine bay Halon gas fire extinguisher which was angled across the intercooler substantially boosting the power of the engine in the crucial drive up the mountain straight. As this was not technically against the rules the scrutineers did not find any misconduct, but the Entrants Association levied a $5000 fine on Brock for a moral infringement of the rules.

Class structure
Cars competed in three classes defined by engine capacity.

Class 1
Class 1 (Over 2501cc) featured the turbocharged Ford Sierras, Nissan Skylines, Toyota Supras and Mitsubishi Starions, the V8 Holden Commodores and BMW 635CSis.

Class 2
Class 2 (1601 to 2500cc) comprised BMW M3s and a Nissan Gazelle.

Class 3
Class 3 (Up to 1600cc) was contested exclusively by various models of Toyota Corolla.

Tooheys Top Ten

The Tooheys Top Ten was contested on the Saturday by the fastest ten cars from Friday to determine the final positions for the first five rows on the grid.
For the first time since the advent of the Top Ten in 1978, television broadcaster Channel 7 aired the runoff in a one-hour package on the Saturday afternoon rather than the half-hour package of previous years. The extra time meant that each lap was shown in full for the first time rather than just sections of the laps run.

* Peter Brock's only ever pole position at Bathurst where he didn't drive a V8 powered Holden. It was his first Bathurst pole since 1983 (and the last he would set himself), and his first front row start since 1984. It was also his record 6th Bathurst pole having been fastest qualifier in 1974, 1977, 1978 and 1979 and 1983.* Andrew Bagnall crashed his Ford Sierra RS500 on top of The Mountain during the runoff and was allowed to start from 10th position, much like Dick Johnson who crashed his Ford XE Falcon in the runoff in 1983. Unlike Johnson  in 1983 however, Bagnall's car was able to be repaired and did not need to be replaced.* 1989 was the first time that a V8 Holden had not qualified for the Top Ten runoff. The fastest Holden was the #16 Holden Racing Team VL Commodore SS Group A SV of Larry Perkins and defending race winner Tomas Mezera in 11th with a 2:19.11 set by Perkins, missing out by only 0.01 seconds to Bagnall's Sierra.* 1989 saw the only time between 1981 and 2003 that a car in which Larry Perkins was listed as a driver did not feature in the runoff.* 1989 saw the first and so far only time where every car in the Top Ten runoff was powered by a turbocharged engine, with nine Sierra RS500's and the lone factory Nissan Skyline of Jim Richards making up the 10 runners.

Official results

Statistics
 Provisional Pole Position – #17 Dick Johnson – 2:16.58
 Pole Position – #05 Peter Brock – 2:15.80
 Fastest Lap – #17 Dick Johnson – 2:19.12 – Lap 2
 Average Speed – 154 km/h
 Race time of winning car – 6:30:53.44

See also
1989 Australian Touring Car season

References

External links
Tooheys 1000 Bathurst 1989, www.touringcarracing.net
"Tooheys 1000 – Mount Panorama, Bathurst – 1st October, 1989", www.uniquecarsandparts.com.au
Images from the 1989 Tooheys 1000, www.autopics.com.au

Motorsport in Bathurst, New South Wales
Tooheys 1000